Iacone is a surname. Notable people with the surname include:

Joe Iacone (born 1940), American football player
Simone Iacone (born 1984), Italian auto racing driver

See also
Iaconi